Simon Ashdown is a British television writer, best known as being a BAFTA award-nominated EastEnders writer.

Career
From 1995 to 2013, Ashdown was series consultant and lead writer on EastEnders. He was involved in the creation of the Slater family, and along with other writers, developed the characters around the actors themselves, rather than the other way round.  He created the character of Max Branning and was responsible for numerous key episodes such as Ethel Skinner's death, Stacey Slater's bipolar and the "Who Killed Archie?" storyline. In 2010 he wrote the twenty fifth anniversary live episode, "EastEnders Live". More recent episodes that he has written include Pat Evans' death, Mandy Salter's second exit, Janine Butcher's temporary exit, the aftermath of David Wicks' return and the Jake Stone and Sadie Young reveal. He returned to EastEnders to write the Christmas 2017 episode which saw Tanya Branning return and Abi Branning and Lauren Branning fall from a rooftop. He then returned to write the Christmas 2018 episodes, in which Hayley Slater pushes Alfie Moon down the stairs and he then kidnaps their daughter, Cherry Slater. He returned to EastEnders in December 2019 and in September 2020, to write the climax of Linda Carter's battle with alcoholism and Chantelle Atkins's death at the hands of husband Gray Atkins, respectively. In January 2021 he wrote the episode of Ian Beale's departure and the following month, he wrote the departing episode of Max Branning.

Alongside his work on EastEnders, he also wrote and co-created, with Jeremy Dyson of The League of Gentlemen, the innovative drama Funland which was nominated for the Best Drama Serial BAFTA in 2006.  He wrote the two-part drama Kitchen starring Eddie Izzard and Perfect for Film Four, directed by Rankin and starring Marc Warren. He has worked on numerous other drama series including City Central, Casualty and has acted as story consultant on numerous productions including Crash Palace for Sky and Come Fly With Me for the BBC. He recently adapted Franz Kafka's The Trial with Jeremy Dyson for the BBC.

The RTÉ series Raw is based on Kitchen, it is currently in its fourth season.

Writing credits

Awards and nominations

References

External links

Year of birth missing (living people)
Living people
BAFTA winners (people)
British male television writers